Smulpaj (crumb pie) is a Swedish dessert. It differs from traditional pies in that it has no pastry shell; instead, fillings are added directly to the pie dish after greasing. Butter is mixed with sugar, wheat flour and oatmeal to make a crumbly dough that is strewn over the fillings. This is then baked as the crust.

Smulpaj is commonly made with apples, rhubarb, or bilberries, and served with whipped cream, vanilla sauce,  or ice cream.

References

Fruit pies
Swedish desserts

sv:Paj#Smulpaj